Carol Voisin (born January 29, 1947) is a member of the faculty at Southern Oregon University, where she teaches ethics, critical thinking, and writing. A peace activist in the Vietnam War era, she has long been active in Democratic Party politics.

Voisin was born in Colby, Kansas and raised in Colorado. She earned a B.A. in social science from Colorado State University, an M.Div. from Iliff School of Theology and a Th.D. from the Graduate Theological Union.

Voisin has managed academic programs at Duke University and the Pacific School of Religion. She currently teaches ethics, critical thinking, and writing at Southern Oregon University.

2006 congressional campaign
In May, 2006, Voisin became the Democratic nominee for U.S. Congress in Oregon's 2nd congressional district, winning the primary in a race between four candidates.

Voisin faced incumbent Republican Greg Walden in the 2006 general election. Her campaign stressed Walden's support for Bush administration policies, including invasion of Iraq, health care policies she characterized as inadequate, record budget deficits, and cuts in federal education spending, and environmental policies she described as disastrous. Outspent $1,160,087 to $58,621, she was defeated.
Voison's 30.36 percent of the vote pushed Walden's winning percentage below 70 percent for the first and so far only time in 9 re-election bids.

References

External links 
Carol Voisin's Congressional campaign site, as archived at archive.org

Colorado State University alumni
1947 births
Living people
People from Colby, Kansas
Duke University faculty
Southern Oregon University faculty
Women in Oregon politics
Oregon Democrats
Candidates in the 2006 United States elections
21st-century American politicians
Graduate Theological Union alumni
21st-century American women politicians
American women academics